List of Registered Historic Places in Taunton, Massachusetts, which has been transferred from and is an integral part of National Register of Historic Places listings in Bristol County, Massachusetts

|}

See also

List of National Historic Landmarks in Massachusetts

References

History of Bristol County, Massachusetts
Taunton, Massachusetts
Taunton
Taunton, Massachusetts